Gertrude of Baden (before 1160 – before 1225) was a Margravine of Baden by birth and by marriage a Countess of Dagsburg.  She was a daughter of Margrave Hermann III of Baden and his wife, Bertha of Lorraine.

Marriages and issue 
Gertrude married in 1180 to Albert II of Dagsburg (d. 1211). With him she had two sons, Henry and William, and a daughter, Gertrude (d. 1225).  Both sons were killed in a tournament in Andain in 1202, so that the noble family of the Etichonids died out in the male line with Albert II in 1211.  This left her daughter Gertrude as heiress of the county of Dagsburg.

Her daughter Gertrude married in 1206 in her first marriage to Duke Theobald I of Lorraine.  In 1217, she married her second husband, Count Theobald IV of Champagne, who was also King of Navarre from 1234 as Theobald I.  Theobald, however, repudiated her before 1223.  In 1224, she married her third husband, Simon III of Saarbrücken and Leiningen (d. 1234 or 36), the son of Count Frederick II of Leiningen and Saarbrücken.  When she died childless, her third husband Simon of Leiningen inherited the county of Dagsburg, thus creating the Leiningen-Dagsburg line.

References

Sources

External links 
 Gertrud at the Medieval Lands Project

Princesses of Baden
Margravines of Baden
German countesses
12th-century German nobility
13th-century German nobility
Year of birth uncertain
12th-century births
13th-century deaths
13th-century German women
Daughters of monarchs